Industrial Society and Its Future, generally known as the Unabomber Manifesto, is a 1995 anti-technology essay by Ted Kaczynski, the "Unabomber". The manifesto contends that the Industrial Revolution began a harmful process of natural destruction brought about by technology, while forcing humans to adapt to machinery, creating a sociopolitical order that suppresses human freedom and potential. The 35,000-word manifesto formed the ideological foundation of Kaczynski's 1978–1995 mail bomb campaign, designed to protect wilderness by hastening the collapse of industrial society.

It was printed in a supplement to The Washington Post after Kaczynski offered to end his bombing campaign for national exposure. Attorney General Janet Reno authorized the printing to help the FBI identify the author. The printings and publicity around them eclipsed the bombings in notoriety, and led to Kaczynski's identification by his brother, David Kaczynski.

The manifesto argues against accepting individual technological advancements as purely positive without accounting for their overall effect, which includes the fall of small-scale living, and the rise of uninhabitable cities. While originally regarded as a thoughtful critique of modern society, with roots in the work of academic authors such as Jacques Ellul, Desmond Morris, and Martin Seligman, Kaczynski's 1996 trial polarized public opinion around the essay, as his court-appointed lawyers tried to justify their insanity defense around characterizing the manifesto as the work of a madman, and the prosecution lawyers rested their case on it being produced by a lucid mind.

While Kaczynski's actions were generally condemned, his manifesto expressed ideas that continue to be generally shared among the American public. A 2017 Rolling Stone article stated that Kaczynski was an early adopter of the concept that:

"We give up a piece of ourselves whenever we adjust to conform to society's standards. That, and we're too plugged in. We're letting technology take over our lives, willingly."

The Labadie Collection of the University of Michigan houses a copy of Industrial Society and its Future, which has been translated into French, remains on college reading lists, and was updated in Kaczynski's 2016 Anti-Tech Revolution: Why and How, which defends his political philosophy in greater depth.

Background and publication 

Between 1978 and 1995, Ted Kaczynski engaged in a mail bomb campaign against people involved with modern technology. His initial targets were universities and airlines, which the FBI shortened as UNABOM. In June 1995, Kaczynski offered to end his campaign if one of several publications (the Washington Post, New York Times, or Penthouse) would publish his critique of technology, titled Industrial Society and Its Future, which became widely known as the "Unabomber Manifesto".

Kaczynski believed that his violence, as direct action when words were insufficient, would draw others to pay attention to his critique. He wanted his ideas to be taken seriously. The media debated the ethics of publishing the manifesto under duress.  The United States Attorney General Janet Reno advocated for the essay to be shared so that a reader could potentially recognize its author.

During that summer, the FBI worked with literature scholars to compare the Unabomber's oeuvre against the works of Joseph Conrad, including The Secret Agent, based on their shared themes.

The Washington Post published the manifesto in full within a supplement on September 19, 1995, splitting the cost with The New York Times. According to a statement, the Post had the "mechanical ability to distribute a separate section in all copies of its daily newspaper." A Berkeley-based chess book publisher began publishing copies in paperback the next month, without Kaczynski's consent.

Kaczynski had drafted an essay of the ideas that would become the manifesto in 1971, which declared that technological progress would extinguish individual liberty and that proselytizing libertarian philosophy would be insufficient without direct action. The original, handwritten manifesto sold for $20,053 in a 2011 auction of Kaczynski's assets, along with typewritten editions and their typewriters, to raise restitution for his victims.

Contents 

At 35,000 words, Industrial Society and Its Future lays very detailed blame on technology for destroying human-scale communities. Kaczynski contends that the Industrial Revolution harmed the human race by developing into a sociopolitical order that subjugates human needs beneath its own. This system, he wrote, destroys nature and suppresses individual freedom. In short, humans adapt to machines rather than vice versa, resulting in a society hostile to human potential.

Kaczynski indicts technological progress for its destruction of small human communities and the rise of uninhabitable cities controlled by an unaccountable state. He contends that this relentless technological progress will not dissipate on its own, because individual technological advancements are seen as good despite the sum effects of this progress. Kaczynski describes modern society as defending against dissent an order in which individuals are "adjusted" to fit the system and those outside the system are seen as "bad".

This tendency, he says, gives rise to expansive police powers, mind-numbing mass media, and indiscriminate promotion of drugs. He criticizes both big government and big business as the inevitable result of industrialization, and holds scientists and "technophiles" responsible for recklessly pursuing power through technological advancements.

He argues that this industrialized system's collapse will be devastating and that quickening the collapse—before industrialization further progresses—will mitigate the devastation's impact. He justifies the trade-offs that come with losing industrial society as being worth the cost. Kaczynski's ideal revolution seeks not to overthrow government, but rather, the economic and technological foundation of modern society. He seeks to destroy existing society and protect the wilderness, the antithesis of technology.

Influences 
Industrial Society and Its Future echoed contemporary critics of technology and industrialization such as John Zerzan, Jacques Ellul, Rachel Carson, Lewis Mumford, and E. F. Schumacher.
Its idea of the "disruption of the power process" similarly echoed social critics who emphasize that the lack of meaningful work is a primary cause of social problems, including Mumford, Paul Goodman, and Eric Hoffer. Aldous Huxley addressed its general theme in Brave New World, to which Kaczynski refers in his text. Kaczynski's ideas of "oversocialization" and "surrogate activities" recall Sigmund Freud's Civilization and Its Discontents and its theories of rationalization and sublimation (a term which Kaczynski uses three times to describe "surrogate activities").

However, a 2021 study by Sean Fleming shows that many of these similarities are coincidental. Kaczynski had not read Lewis Mumford, Paul Goodman, or John Zerzan until after he submitted Industrial Society and Its Future to The New York Times and The Washington Post. There is no evidence that he read Freud, Carson, or Schumacher. Instead, Fleming argues, Industrial Society and Its Future "is a synthesis of ideas from [...] French philosopher Jacques Ellul, British zoologist Desmond Morris, and American psychologist Martin Seligman."

Kaczynski's understanding of technology, his idea of maladaptation, and his critique of leftism are largely derived from Ellul's 1954 book, The Technological Society. Kaczynski's concept of “surrogate activities” comes from Desmond Morris's concept of “survival-substitute activities,” while his concept of “the power process” combines Morris's concept of “the Stimulus Struggle” with Seligman's concept of learned helplessness. Fleming's study relies on archival material from the Labadie Collection at the University of Michigan, including a "secret" set of footnotes that Kaczynski did not include in the Washington Post version of Industrial Society and Its Future.

The scholar George Michael of Vanderbilt University press accused Kaczynski of "collecting philosophical and environmental clichés to reinforce common American concerns".

Aftermath
Kaczynski had intended for his mail bombing campaign to raise awareness for the message in Industrial Society and Its Future, which he wanted to be seriously regarded. With its initial publication in 1995, the manifesto was received as intellectually deep and sane. Writers described the manifesto's sentiment as familiar.

To Kirkpatrick Sale, the Unabomber was "a rational man" with reasonable beliefs about technology. He recommended the manifesto's opening sentence for the forefront of American politics. Cynthia Ozick likened the work to an American Raskolnikov (of Dostoevsky's Crime and Punishment), as a "philosophical criminal of exceptional intelligence and humanitarian purpose ... driven to commit murder out of an uncompromising idealism". Numerous websites engaging with the manifesto's message appeared online.

While Kaczynski's effort to publish his manifesto, more so than the bombings themselves, brought him into the American news, and the manifesto was widely spread via newspapers, book reprints, and the Internet, ultimately, the ideas in the manifesto were eclipsed by reaction to the violence of the bombings, and did not spark the serious public consideration he was looking for.

Reading the manifesto, Linda Patrik, David Kaczynski's wife, suspected her husband's brother authorship due to his linguistic mannerisms, and commented such information to her husband.
At first, he disbelieved that his own brother could be the author of the Manifiesto, but upon comparing the previous letters that they shared, he found the irrefutable proof; one of Ted's mannerisms was found in one of letters that they exchanged, just as it was written on the Manifiesto.
Upon this discovery, David Kaczynski notified the FBI.

Effect of the trial
After Ted Kaczynski's April 1996 arrest, he wanted to use the trial to disseminate his views, but the judge denied him permission to represent himself. Instead, his court-appointed lawyers planned an insanity defense that would discredit Industrial Society and Its Future against his will. The prosecution's psychiatrists counter-cited the manifesto as evidence of the Unabomber's lucidity, and Kaczynski's sanity was tried in court and in the media. Kaczynski responded by taking a plea bargain for life imprisonment without parole in May 1998.

Kaczynski's biographer argued that the public should look beyond this "genius-or-madman debate", and view the manifesto as reflecting normal, common, unexceptional ideas shared by Americans, sharing their distrust over the direction of civilization. While most Americans abhorred his violence, adherents to his anti-technology message have celebrated his call to question technology and preserve wilderness. From his Colorado maximum security prison, he continues to clarify his philosophy with other writers through correspondence.

Legacy

Part of Kaczynski's manifesto was cited by the inventor and author Raymond Kurzweil in his book The Age of Spiritual Machines, and then mentioned in the article "Why the Future Doesn't Need Us" by computer scientist Bill Joy. In the autumn of 1998, Joy recalls, "Ray and I were both speakers at George Gilder's Telecosm conference, and I encountered him by chance in the bar of the hotel after both our sessions were over. I was sitting with John Searle, a Berkeley philosopher who studies consciousness. While we were talking, Ray approached and a conversation began, the subject of which haunts me to this day."

As of 2000, Industrial Society and Its Future remained on college reading lists and the green anarchist and eco-extremist movements came to hold Kaczynski's writing in high regard, with the manifesto finding a niche audience among critics of technology, such as the speculative science fiction and anarcho-primitivist communities. It has since been translated into French by Jean-Marie Apostolidès.

Since 2000, the Labadie Collection houses a copy of the manifesto, along with the Unabomber's other writings, letters and papers, after he officially designated the University of Michigan to receive them. They have since become one of the most popular archives in their special collections.

In 2017, an article in Rolling Stone stated that Kaczynski was an early adopter of the idea that:
"We give up a piece of ourselves whenever we adjust to conform to society's standards. That, and we're too plugged in. We're letting technology take over our lives, willingly."

In 2018, New York magazine stated that the manifesto generated later interest from neoconservatives, environmentalists, and anarcho-primitivists.

In December 2020, a man who was arrested at Charleston International Airport on a charge of "conveying false information regarding attempted use of a destructive device" after he falsely threatened that he had a bomb was found to have been carrying the Unabomber manifesto.

Reprints and further work
Feral House republished the manifesto in Kaczynski's first book, the 2010 Technological Slavery, alongside correspondence and an interview. Kaczynski was unsatisfied with the book and his lack of control in its publication. Kaczynski's 2016 Anti-Tech Revolution: Why and How updates his 1995 manifesto with more relevant references and defends his political philosophy in greater depth.

See also 
 Accelerationism
 Anarchism and violence
 Anarcho-primitivism
 Criticism of technology
 Declinism
 Eco-terrorism
 Green anarchism
 Neo-Luddism
 Propaganda of the deed
 How to Blow Up a Pipeline

References

Bibliography

Further reading

External links
 Full manifesto from the Washington Post
 Mobile-friendly version of the full manifesto

1995 essays
Anarchist manifestos
Eco-terrorism
Technophobia